Haplothrips aculeatus is a species of thrips. It is a pest of millets such as sorghum, finger millet, pearl millet, and foxtail millet in Asia.

References

Phlaeothripidae
Insect pests of millets